Carl E. Schneider is an American lawyer and bioethicist. He serves as Chauncey Stillman Professor of Law and as Professor of Internal Medicine at the University of Michigan. He was educated at Harvard College and received his JD from the University of Michigan. Schneider subsequently clerked for Judge Carl McGowan of the United States Court of Appeals for the District of Columbia Circuit; he served in the same capacity for Justice Potter Stewart of the United States Supreme Court.

Schneider has authored several books, including The Censor's Hand: The Misregulation of Human-Subject Research.

Views on institutional review boards 
Schneider has argued that institutional review boards are unnecessary and harmful, restricting useful and innocuous research while being likely to permit truly dangerous studies. He stated in a 2018 lecture that IRBs are "deeply unethical system[s] of regulation" because they fail to reach consistent decisions and prohibit many experiments which have the potential to benefit patient health. Schneider cited a multi-center study of vitamin A supplementation for neonatal ICU patients which IRBs halted: one institution's IRB rejected the study because it considered the experiment unnecessary, claiming the benefits of vitamin A supplementation were proven; another denied it because it considered the effects of vitamin A on neonates too ill-studied to be ethical. He continued by noting that even without IRB approval, the doctors running the study would have had the ability to give or not give vitamin A to their patients, and even to collect data on the two groups. However, to compare the patients would require IRB approval.

See also 
 List of law clerks of the Supreme Court of the United States (Seat 8)

References 

Living people
Year of birth missing (living people)
Bioethicists
University of Michigan faculty
Harvard University alumni
University of Michigan Law School alumni
Law clerks of the Supreme Court of the United States